= Education in Washington =

Education in Washington may refer to:

- Education in Washington (state)
- Education in Washington, D.C.
